The discography of English rock band Joy Division consists of two studio albums, four live albums, twelve compilation albums, three extended plays, and five singles. The list does not include material performed by former members of Joy Division that was recorded as New Order (formed by the surviving members of the band after the death of singer Ian Curtis) or related side projects.

Joy Division was formed in 1976 by guitarist Bernard Sumner and bassist Peter Hook, later recruiting singer Ian Curtis and drummer Stephen Morris. The band released its debut album, Unknown Pleasures, in 1979 on independent label Factory. On 18 May 1980, the eve of the band's first American tour, Curtis was found dead in his home. Unable to continue as Joy Division, the remaining members disbanded the group. The band's second album, Closer, was released two months later to critical acclaim. Since then, several posthumous releases have been issued from the band.

Albums

Studio albums

Live albums

Compilation albums

Extended plays

Singles 

Notes

Other certified songs

Video albums

Other appearances

See also 

 Warsaw, a bootleg of sessions planned for a debut album while Joy Division were briefly associated with RCA Records.
 Martin Hannett's Personal Mixes, a bootleg of studio snippets and alternative mixes of Joy Division made by Martin Hannett.

References

External links
 
 
 

Discographies of British artists
Discography
Rock music group discographies